Saranya Nagh is an Indian actress who has appeared in Tamil language films. She made her debut in a supporting role in Balaji Sakthivel's critically acclaimed Kaadhal (2004), before playing leading roles in Peraanmai (2009) and Mazhaikaalam (2012).

Career
Saranya was born and brought up in Chennai Tamil Nadu She finished her schooling from Durga matriculation and Higher Secondary School, Kodambakkam.

Saranya acted as a child artist in Nee Varuvai Ena. She was in Class IX, when cinematographer Vijay Milton referred her on to Balaji Sakthivel who had subsequently cast her in Kaadhal. She was initially considered to play the heroine in the film, but the role was later handed to Sandhya, after the director felt she looked too young. She thus made her debut in a supporting role in the film as Sandhya's friend, and the film went on to win critical and commercial acclaim. Her role was well received and prompted a producer to sign her on for the lead role in a Oru Vaarthai Pesu, but the film was later shelved. She followed this up with the lead role in a low-budget Telugu film titled 10th Class. After appearing in another low-budget production Vilayattu, Saranya  went on to appear as one of the five girls alongside Vasundra and Dhansika in S. P. Jananathan's Peraanmai, which featured Jayam Ravi in the lead role and won positive reviews. After the success of Peranmai, she signed several projects including Thiruvasagam with Aryan Rajesh and Saravana Kudil with Tarun Gopi, but the films failed to materialize. Thiruvasagam was revived in 2013 and its title was changed to Eera Veyyil.

Her solo lead role came in Mazhaikaalam directed by Deepan, its director and co-starring newcomer Sriram. Prior to release, the film made the headlines after it was reported that Saranya would appear nude in a crucial scene. Saranya then clarified that she wore a skin-toned costume, and the scene was shot aesthetically. In 2013 she appeared in two Telugu films Prema Oka Maikam.

Filmography 

 Short films
 Bodhai
 Marai Nahal

References

External links 
 

Indian film actresses
Actresses in Tamil cinema
Living people
Actresses from Chennai
Actresses in Telugu cinema
Indian child actresses
Child actresses in Tamil cinema
20th-century Indian actresses
21st-century Indian actresses
Year of birth missing (living people)